Old Shoes is a 1925 American silent indepenent drama film directed by Frederick Stowers and starring Noah Beery, Viora Daniel and Zasu Pitts. A melodrama it sees a widowed woman marry her husband's brother, who soon proves to be a tyrant stepfather to his adopted son.

Cast
 Noah Beery as The Stepfather
 John Harron as The Boy 
 Viora Daniel 		
 Ethel Grey Terry 	
 Zasu Pitts  	
 Russell Simpson	
 Snitz Edwards

References

Bibliography
 Connelly, Robert B. The Silents: Silent Feature Films, 1910-36, Volume 40, Issue 2. December Press, 1998.
 Munden, Kenneth White. The American Film Institute Catalog of Motion Pictures Produced in the United States, Part 1. University of California Press, 1997.

External links
 

1925 films
1925 drama films
1920s English-language films
American silent feature films
Silent American drama films
American black-and-white films
1920s American films